The 2002–03 Munster Rugby season was Munster's second season competing in the Celtic League, alongside which they also competed in the Heineken Cup. It was Declan Kidney's fifth and final season in his first spell as head coach of the province.

2002–03 squad

Friendlies

2002–03 Celtic League

Pool A Table

Quarter-final

Semi-final

Final

2002–03 Heineken Cup

Pool 2

Quarter-final

Semi-final

References

External links
2002–03 Munster Rugby season official site 

2002–03
2002–03 in Irish rugby union